WNGH may refer to:

 WNGH-TV
 WNGH-FM